Stefan Janković may refer to:

Stefan Janković (basketball) (born 1993), Serbian basketball player
Stefan Janković (basketball, born 2004), Serbian basketball player
Stefan Janković (footballer) (born 1997), Serbian footballer
Stefan Janković (handballer) (born 1992), Bosnian handballer